Shiva Parvathi (Kannada: ಶಿವ ಪಾರ್ವತಿ) is a 1950 Indian Kannada film, directed by T. Janakiram and produced by Hunsur Krishnamurthy. The film stars Kemparaj Urs, Prathima Devi, Sumathi Kashinath and Shantha in the lead roles. The film has musical score by B. Dayanidhi.

Cast
Kemparaj Urs
Prathima Devi
Sumathi Kashinath
Shantha

References

External links
 

1950s Kannada-language films